Astronomy Picture of the Day (APOD) is a website provided by NASA and Michigan Technological University (MTU). According to the website, "Each day a different image or photograph of our universe is featured, along with a brief explanation written by a professional astronomer."
The photograph does not necessarily correspond to a celestial event on the exact day that it is displayed, and images are sometimes repeated.
However, the pictures and descriptions often relate to current events in astronomy and space exploration. The text has several hyperlinks to more pictures and websites for more information. The images are either visible spectrum photographs, images taken at non-visible wavelengths and displayed in false color, video footage, animations, artist's conceptions, or micrographs that relate to space or cosmology. Past images are stored in the APOD Archive, with the first image appearing on June 16, 1995. This initiative has received support from NASA, the National Science Foundation, and MTU. The images are sometimes authored by people or organizations outside NASA, and therefore APOD images are often copyrighted, unlike many other NASA image galleries.

When the APOD website was created, it received a total of 14 page views on its first day. , the APOD website has received over a billion image views throughout its lifetime. APOD is also translated into 21 languages daily.

APOD was presented at a meeting of the American Astronomical Society in 1996. Its practice of using hypertext was analyzed in a paper in 2000. It received a Scientific American Sci/Tech Web Award in 2001. In 2002, the website was featured in an interview with Nemiroff on CNN Saturday Morning News. In 2003, the two authors published a book titled The Universe: 365 Days from Harry N. Abrams, which is a collection of the best images from APOD as a hardcover "coffee table" style book. APOD was the Featured Collection in the November 2004 issue of D-Lib Magazine.

During the United States federal government shutdown of 2013, APOD continued its service on mirror sites.

Dr. Robert J. Nemiroff and Dr. Jerry T. Bonnell were awarded the 2015 Klumpke-Roberts Award by the Astronomical Society of the Pacific "for outstanding contributions to public understanding and appreciation of astronomy" for their work on APOD. The site was awarded the International Astronomical Union's 2022 Astronomy Outreach Prize.

Pictures

References

External links 

 
 APOD Archive
 About APOD – includes a list of mirror websites
 Astronomy Picture of the Day RSS Feed – Official RSS feed
 Official list of alternative (mirror) sites for when the NASA APOD site is down
 Observatorio – Spanish official translation, with web2.0 features
 Starship Asterisk* – APOD and General Astronomy Discussion Forum
 Astronomy Picture of the Day (APOD) – Official Facebook Page
 Astronomy Picture of the Day App – Official iOS mirror
 APOD email service
 List of APOD Mirrors and Social Sites

NASA online
Michigan Technological University
Astronomy education works
American science websites
Internet properties established in 1995